The , is a Shinto shrine in the town of Mori,  Shūchi District,  Shizuoka Prefecture, Japan. It is one of the two shrines claiming the title of ichinomiya of former Tōtōmi Province. The main festival of the shrine is held annually on April 18.

Enshrined kami
The kami enshrined at Okuni Jinja is:
  Ōnamuchi-no-mikoto (大己貴命), kami of nation-building, agriculture, medicine, and protective magic
Beppyo shrines

History
The date of Okuni Shrine's foundation is unknown. Shrine tradition gives a date of February 18, 555 (during the reign of Emperor Kinmei) as the date when a shrine was first constructed on the summit of six-kilometer distant 511-meter Mount Hongū, which now forms part of the shrine's grounds.  The shrine only appears in historical records from an entry within the Shoku Nihon Kōki dated June 14, 884 and it is mentioned again in the Engishiki records, but is still listed as a "minor shrine". It has been styled the ichinomiya of Tōtōmi Province since at least 1235, and continued to be referred to as the “Ichinomiya” until the end of the Edo period. Due to the waning power of the Imperial Court, imperial messages ceased to be sent to the shrine from the Muromachi period. The shrine was destroyed when Takeda Shingen invaded Tōtōmi in 1572 and the shrine's priests sided with Tokugawa Ieyasu. It was rebuilt by Tokugawa Ieyasu in 1575, and subsequent generations of Tokugawa shōguns continued to support the shrine.  

During the Meiji period era of State Shinto, the shrine was rated as a prefectural shrine in 1873, and was promoted to a   under the Modern system of ranked Shinto Shrines in 1874.

The shrine is located a 50-minute walk from Tōtōmi-Ichinomiya Station on the Tenryū Hamanako Railroad

Events
The main festival of the shrine is held annually on April 18, during which time a set of twelve dances are performed. This performance is said to date to the early Heian period and is a National Intangible Cultural Property.

Gallery

See also
 List of Shinto shrines in Japan
 List of Important Intangible Folk Cultural Properties
 Ichinomiya

References

External links

Official home page

Shinto shrines in Shizuoka Prefecture
Mori, Shizuoka
Tōtōmi Province
Ichinomiya